Jezierzyce Słupskie or Jezierzyce Słupsk is a PKP railway station in Jezierzyce, Pomeranian Voivodeship, Poland. It is a historic railway station built in 1870 in the Prussian Partition of east-central Pomerania, now located on the outskirts of the Jezierzyce housing estate.

The station is reached by PR trains from Gdynia.

Lines crossing the station

Train services
The station is served by the following services:

Regional services (R) Tczew — Słupsk  
Regional services (R) Malbork — Słupsk  
Regional services (R) Elbląg — Słupsk  
Regional services (R) Słupsk — Bydgoszcz Główna 
Regional services (R) Słupsk — Gdynia Główna

References

Railway stations in Pomeranian Voivodeship